The Dodo is a fictional character appearing in Chapters 2 and 3 of the 1865 book Alice's Adventures in Wonderland by Lewis Carroll (Charles Lutwidge Dodgson). The Dodo is a caricature of the author. A popular but unsubstantiated belief is that Dodgson chose the particular animal to represent himself because of his stammer, and thus would accidentally introduce himself as "Do-do-dodgson".

Historically, the dodo was a non-flying bird that lived on the island of Mauritius, east of Madagascar in the Indian Ocean. It became extinct in the mid 17th century during the colonisation of the island by the Dutch.

Alice's Adventures in Wonderland
 
In this passage Lewis Carroll incorporated references to the original boating expedition of 4 July 1862 during which Alice's Adventures were first told, with Alice as herself, and the others represented by birds: the Lory was Lorina Liddell, the Eaglet was Edith Liddell, the Dodo was Dodgson, and the Duck was Rev. Robinson Duckworth.  In order to get dry after a swim, the Dodo proposes that everyone run a Caucus race – where the participants run in patterns of any shape, starting and leaving off whenever they like, so that everyone wins.  At the end of the race, Alice distributes comfits from her pocket to all as prizes. However this leaves no prize for herself.  The Dodo inquires what else she has in her pocket.  As she has only a thimble, the Dodo requests it from her and then awards it to Alice as her prize.  The Caucus Race, as depicted by Carroll, is a satire on the political caucus system, mocking its lack of clarity and decisiveness.

Interpretations

Disney animated film version

In the Disney film, the Dodo plays a much greater role in the story. He is merged with the character of Pat the Gardener, which leads to him sometimes being nicknamed Pat the Dodo, but this name is never mentioned in the film. The Dodo is also the leader of the caucus race. He has the appearance and personality of a sea captain. The Dodo is voiced by Bill Thompson and animated by Milt Kahl.

Dodo is first seen as Alice is floating on the sea in a bottle. Dodo is seen singing, but when Alice asks him for help, he does not notice her. On shore, Dodo is seen on a rock, organizing a caucus race. This race involves running around until one gets dry, but the attempts are hampered by incoming waves.

Dodo is later summoned by the White Rabbit, when the rabbit believes a monster, actually Alice having magically grown to a giant size, is inside his home. Dodo brings Bill the Lizard, and attempts to get him to go down the chimney. Bill refuses at first, but Dodo is able to convince him otherwise. However, the soot causes Alice to sneeze, sending Bill high up into the sky. Dodo then decides to burn the house down, much to the chagrin of the White Rabbit. He begins gathering wood, such as the furniture, for this purpose. However, Alice is soon able to return to a smaller size and exit the house.

The White Rabbit soon leaves, while Dodo asks for matches, not realizing that the situation has been resolved. He then asks Alice for a match, but when she doesn't have any, Dodo complains about the lack of cooperation and uses his pipe to light the fire.

The Dodo later appears briefly at the end of the film, conducting another Caucus Race.

In Alice's Wonderland Bakery, Dodo has returned and has a son named Jojo.

Tim Burton's Alice in Wonderland version

In Tim Burton's adaptation of Alice in Wonderland, the Dodo's appearance retains the subtle apparent nature from John Tenniel's illustration. He bears a down of brilliant blue and wears a navy blue waistcoat and white spats along with glasses and a cane. He is one of Alice's good-willed advisers, taking first note of her abilities as the true Alice. He is also one of the oldest inhabitants. His name is Uilleam, and he is portrayed by Michael Gough. He goes with the White Rabbit, Tweedledum and Tweedledee, and Dormouse to take Alice to Caterpillar to decide whether Alice is the real one. He is later captured by the Red Queen's forces. When Alice came to the Red Queen's castle, he was seen at the Red Queen's castle yard as a caddy for the Queen's croquet game. After the Red Queen orders the release of the Jubjub bird to kill all her subjects from rebelling, he is then seen briefly running from it when the Tweedles went to hide from it and escaped but was snatched by the Jubjub and was never seen again throughout the film.

His name may be based on a lecture on William the Conqueror from Chapter Three of the original novel. The character is voiced by Michael Gough in his final feature film role before his death in 2011. Gough came out of retirement to appear in the film but the character only speaks three lines, so Gough managed to record in one day.

References

Lewis Carroll characters
Fictional flightless birds
Literary characters introduced in 1865
Dodo
Male characters in literature